"Take Five" is a jazz standard composed by Paul Desmond. It was first recorded in 1959 and is the third track on Time Out by the Dave Brubeck Quartet. Frequently covered by a variety of artists, the track is the biggest-selling jazz song of all time and a Grammy Hall of Fame inductee.

Dave Brubeck was inspired to create an album based on odd time signatures during his state sponsored 1958 Eurasia trip. The track was written after the Quartet's drummer, Joe Morello, requested a song in quintuple meter. Desmond composed the melodies on Morello's rhythms while Brubeck arranged the song. The track's name is derived from its meter. The track is written in E minor and is in ternary (ABA) form.

Released as a promotional single in September 1959, the track would not achieve commercial success until it became a sleeper hit in 1961. "Take Five" went on to become the biggest-selling jazz single of all time and still receives significant radio airplay. The single was inducted into the Grammy Hall of Fame in 1996.

Background and recording 
The Dave Brubeck Quartet's U.S. State Department-sponsored tour of Eurasia in 1958 inspired Dave Brubeck to create an album, Time Out, that experimented with odd time signatures like he had encountered abroad. "Take Five" was composed after most of the album's music had been written. The Quartet's drummer, Joe Morello, frequently soloed in  time and asked Brubeck to compose a new piece to showcase his ability. Brubeck delegated Desmond to write a tune using Morello's rhythm. Desmond composed two melodies, which Brubeck arranged in ternary form.

The Quartet first tried recording "Take Five" on June 25, 1959. It proved so arduous that, after 40 minutes and more than 20 failed attempts, producer Teo Macero suspended the effort because one or another of the members kept losing the beat. They successfully recorded the single and the album track in two takes at the next session on July 1. Desmond considered the track a "throwaway".  The  Quartet first played "Take Five" for a live audience at the Newport Jazz Festival on July 5, 1959.

Composition

"Take Five" is written in the key of E minor, in ternary (ABA) form and in quintuple time. The song is known for its distinctive two-chord piano/bass vamp (Em-Bm7); its cool-jazz saxophone melodies; its drum solo; and its unorthodox meter, from which Dave Brubeck derived its name. Desmond believed the borderline decision to retain his bridge melody was key to the tune gaining popularity.

Rhythmically, the five beats to the bar are split unevenly into 3 + 2 quarter notes; that is, the main accents (and chord changes) are on the first and fourth beats. The album version has ten sections:

Release and chart success
Although released as a promotional single on September 21, 1959, "Take Five" became a sleeper hit in 1961. In May 1961, the track was reissued  for radio play and jukebox use, partly in response to its heavy rotation on the radio station WNEW in New York City. That year, it reached No. 25 on the Billboard Hot 100 (October 9), No. 5 on Billboard'''s Easy Listening chart (October 23) and No. 6 on the UK Record Retailer chart (November 16). In 1962, it peaked at No. 8 both in the New Zealand Lever Hit Parade (January 11) and the Dutch Single Top 100 (February 17). The single is a different recording from the LP version and omits most of the drum solo. It became the first jazz single to surpass a million in sales, reaching two million by the time Brubeck disbanded his 'classic' quartet in December 1967.

Columbia Records quickly enlisted "Take Five" in their doomed launch of the -rpm stereo single in the marketplace. Together with a unique stereo edit of "Blue Rondo à la Turk", they pressed the full album version in small numbers for a promotional six-pack of singles sent to DJs in late 1959.

News of Brubeck's death on December 5, 2012 rekindled the popularity of "Take Five" across Europe, the single debuting in the Austrian Top 40 at No. 73 (December 14) and the French Singles Chart at No. 48 (December 15) while re-entering the Dutch charts at No. 50 (December 15).

 

 Future within the Quartet 
The saxophonist, Desmond, wrote and recorded the similar-sounding (and similarly named) composition "Take Ten" for his 1963 solo album Take Ten; he released another rendition of "Take Ten" on his 1973 album Skylark. Over the next 50 years the group re-recorded it many times, and typically used it to close concerts: each member, upon completing his solo, would leave the stage as in Haydn's Farewell Symphony until only the drummer remained ("Take Five" having been composed to feature Morello's mastery of  time). Upon his death from lung cancer in 1977, Desmond left the performance royalties for his compositions, including "Take Five", to the American Red Cross, which has since received payments averaging well over $100,000 a year.

 Legacy 
Take Five was positively received both in its release and current times and is the biggest-selling jazz single of all time. In 2020, The New York Times called the standard "among the most iconic records in Jazz". The single was inducted into the Grammy Hall of Fame in 1996. It has received subsequently replay in movie and television soundtracks, giving it continued radio airplay.

 Covers and adaptations 
"Take Five" is considered a jazz standard and has been covered many times in a variety of genres. The first known cover was by Carmen McRae on the 1961 live album Take Five Live, supported by Brubeck, Gene Wright and Morello. For the recording, McRae sang lyrics written by Brubeck's wife Iola; these lyrics would later be used for other vocal recordings.

Jamaican saxophonist Val Bennett covered the song in 1968 in a roots reggae style, in  time, and retitled "The Russians Are Coming". Bennett's version became the theme of British television series The Secret Life of Machines in the late 1980s. Al Jarreau recorded an acclaimed scat version of the song for NDR Television in Hamburg, West Germany on October 17, 1975. Moe Koffman recorded a cover for his 1996 album Devil’s Brew. In 2011, a version by Pakistan's Sachal Studios Orchestra won widespread acclaim and charted highly on American and British jazz charts. Canadian animator Steven Woloshen created the 2003 animated short film Cameras Take Five'', which animated an improvised series of abstract lines and figures set to the song.

Track listing

Personnel 
  Dave Brubeck – piano
 Paul Desmond – alto saxophone
 Gene Wright – upright bass
 Joe Morello – drums

Notes

References

External links
 
 Licensed lyrics of this song at Genius

1950s jazz standards
Cool jazz standards
Jazz compositions
1959 songs
1961 singles
The Specials songs
Jazz compositions in E-flat minor
Columbia Records singles
Grammy Hall of Fame Award recipients